Giovanni Vincenzo Gravina (20 January 1664 – 6 January 1718) was an Italian man of letters and jurist. He was born at Roggiano Gravina, a small town near Cosenza, in Calabria.

Biography 

Giovanni Vincenzo Gravina was descended from a distinguished family, and under the direction of his maternal uncle, Gregorio Caloprese, who possessed some reputation as a poet and philosopher, received a learned education, after which he studied at Naples civil and Canon law.  In 1689, he came to Rome, where in 1690, he united with several others of literary tastes in forming the Academy of Arcadians.

In 1699, he was appointed to the chair of civil law in the Roman college of La Sapienza, and in 1703, he was transferred to the chair of canon law. 
A schism occurred in the academy in 1711, and Gravina and his followers founded in opposition to it the Academy of Quirina. From Innocent XII Gravina received the offer of various ecclesiastical honors, but declined them from a disinclination to enter the clerical profession.
  
He died at Rome in January 1718.  He was the adoptive father of Metastasio.

Gravina was the author of a number of works of great erudition, the principal being his Origines juris civilis, completed in 3 vols (1713) and his De Romano imperio (1712).

See also 
 Lodovico Sergardi

References

 

1664 births
1718 deaths
People from the Province of Cosenza
17th-century Italian jurists
Canon law jurists
Academic staff of the Sapienza University of Rome
Members of the Academy of Arcadians
18th-century jurists
18th-century Italian jurists
17th-century Latin-language writers
18th-century Latin-language writers
18th-century Italian male writers
Latin-language writers from Italy